Gò Vấp station (Tiếng Việt: Ga Gò Vấp) is a railway station in Gò Vấp, Ho Chi Minh City, Vietnam. This is a station on North–South railway between Bình Triệu station and Saigon station.

References 

Railway stations in Vietnam